Brad Boney is an American author of gay and lesbian fiction. Two of his novels have been finalists for the Lambda Literary Award for Gay Romance.

Personal life 
Born in Findlay, Ohio, Boney lived in Washington, D.C. and Houston before settling in Austin, Texas.

Boney attended New York University.

Awards

Publications 

 Yes (2016)
 Brothers Across Time (2018)

Austin trilogy 

 The Nothingness of Ben (2012)
 The Return (2013)
 The Eskimo Slugger (2014)

References 

Living people
21st-century American writers
American gay writers
New York University alumni
Writers from Ohio
Writers from Austin, Texas
Year of birth missing (living people)